Justice Stein may refer to:

Gary Saul Stein (born 1933), associate justice of the Supreme Court of New Jersey
Leslie Stein (born 1956), judge of the New York Court of Appeals

See also 
Johan Steyn, Baron Steyn (1932–2017), Mr Justice Steyn when an English High Court judge